Mathematically Alive: A Story of Fandom is a 2007 documentary film about fans of the New York Mets directed by Katherine Foronjy and Joseph Coburn.

Awards 
Best Documentary   - 2007 - New Jersey Film Festival, NY
Official Selection - 2007 - Coney Island Film Festival, NY 
Official Selection - 2008 - Trenton Film Festival, NJ 
Official Selection - 2008 - Westchester Film Festival, NY 
Official Selection - 2008 - New Filmmakers Series, NY
Official Selection - 2008 - Baseball Film Festival - National Baseball Hall of Fame, NY
Official Selection - 2008 - Sport Psychology Institute Conference - The University of Southern Maine
Official Selection - 2008 - Queens Museum of Art, NY
Official Selection - 2008 - Queens International Film Festival, NY

External links
 

2007 films
2007 documentary films
2000s sports films
American sports documentary films
Baseball culture
Documentary films about baseball
Documentary films about fandom
New York Mets
2000s English-language films
2000s American films